Pacific Grand Prix was a Formula One motor race.

Pacific Grand Prix may also refer to:
Pacific Racing (also known as "Pacific Grand Prix"), a defunct Formula One team
Pacific motorcycle Grand Prix
The original (1960–1963) name of the Monterey Grand Prix